Hellinsia bogotanus is a moth of the family Pterophoridae. It is found in Colombia.

The forewings are pale ochreous‑brown and the markings are brown. The hindwings and fringes are brown‑grey.

References

Moths described in 1875
bogotanus
Moths of South America